Sambo competition at the 2014 Asian Beach Games was held in Phuket, Thailand from 12 to 13 November 2014 at Karon Beach, Phuket.

Beach Sambo fights were held only in the standing position in three minutes. Victory was awarded after a throw when the opponent as a result of conducting active action falls on the sand on any part of the body other than the feet.

Medalists

Medal table

Results

Men's 68 kg
12 November

Men's 82 kg
12 November

Men's 100 kg
12 November

Women's 52 kg
12 November

Women's 64 kg
12 November

Women's 72 kg
12 November

Mixed team
13 November

References

External links 
 Official website

2014 Asian Beach Games events
Asian Beach Games